Council elections for the Borough of Wyre were held on 2 May 2019 as part of the 2019 United Kingdom local elections.

All locally registered electors (British, Irish, Commonwealth and European Union citizens) who are aged 18 or over on polling day are entitled to vote in the local elections.

Results summary

The results of the 2019 elections are summarised below.

Ward results

Bourne

Breck

Brock with Catterall

Calder

Carleton

Cleveleys Park

Garstang

Great Eccleston

Hambleton and Stalmine

Hardhorn with Highcross

Jubilee

Marsh Mill

Mount

Park

Pharos

Pheasant's Wood

Pilling

Preesall

Rossall

Stanah

Tithebarn

Victoria and Norcross

Warren

Wyresdale

References

2019 English local elections
May 2019 events in the United Kingdom
2019
2010s in Lancashire